Church of Saint Karapet ― the only Armenian Church in Nakhichevan-on-Don which has survived to the present day (with the exception of the Holy Cross Church, which was outside the city limits). It is situated on the territory of the Armenian (Proletarian) Cemetery near its eastern fence.

History 
St. Karapet church was founded in 1875 (its architect was Vasiliy Sazonov), and was consecrated on July 11, 1881. The history of the construction of the temple is associated with the name Nakhichevan noblewoman Akulina Pogosovna Aladjalova, who died in 1871. Aladjalova bequeathed her fortune for the "construction of a stone church at the Armenian cemetery in the name of John the Baptist, as well as establishment of Trustees house, well and houses for the residence of the poor homeless Armenian families". Aladjalova was buried under the south-western wall of the church.

Exterior 
Spatial composition of St. Karapet church was constructed in a combination of basilica and cross-in-square forms. The facades are decorated with carved stone in Armenian architecture style.

The dominant feature in the design of facades is arcade. It is presented in the first tier of the north and south facades which are profiled with archivolt semi-columns. The temple has three entrances - the southern, western and northern. All of them are decorated with perspective portals and completed crosses.

Interior 

Church of St. Karapet had long been the only one among all the churches in the city which was built in the Armenian style (prior to the opening on the site of the destroyed during the Soviet era cathedral, Church of the Holy Sunday in 2011. Interior layout is the same as in other Armenian churches. The interior is characterized with austerity. The iconostasis of the church is decorated with a walnut. The walls are decorated with ornamental plaster medallions and frames, where frescoes are placed.

The central icon of the church is "Our Lady", which is set on a stepped podium. Genuine original frescoes are placed in medallions and frames: these are "Holy Pantaleon", "St. George", " St. Barbara", "St. Stepanos" and others. They are striking in their auserity and noble look of brown-olive color, despite the fact that were painted in the academic manner.

References

Sources 
 Г. Есаулов, В. Черницына, Архитектурная летопись Ростова-на-Дону, Ростов-на-Дону, 1999.
 В. Лобжанидзе, Г. Лаптев, Путешествие по Старому Ростову, Ростов-на-Дону, 1997.
 В. Лобжанидзе, Г. Лаптев, В. Кустов, Путешествие по Старому Ростову, Ростов-на-Дону, 2001, часть 2.

Armenian Apostolic churches in Russia
Churches in Rostov-on-Don
Cultural heritage monuments in Rostov-on-Don
Cultural heritage monuments of regional significance in Rostov Oblast